Toronto East Centre was a federal electoral district represented in the House of Commons of Canada from 1925 to 1935. It was located in the city of Toronto in the province of Ontario. This riding was created in 1924 from parts of Toronto Centre, Toronto East and Toronto South ridings.

It consisted of the part of the city of Toronto south of Bloor Street, north of Toronto Harbour, west of the Don River and the Canadian National Railway line, and east of Avenue Road, Queen's Park Crescent, University Avenue. The area north of Dundas Street and east of Jarvis was excluded from the riding.

The electoral district was abolished in 1933 when it was redistributed between Rosedale and St. Paul's ridings.

Electoral history

|- 
  
|Conservative
|Hon. Edmund BRISTOL
|align="right"| 8,898 
 
|Independent Conservative
|Cecil William   ARMSTRONG
|align="right"|4,935 
  
|Liberal
|John Harold  CASCADEN
|align="right"|4,682
 
|Independent Liberal
|John  CALLAHAN
|align="right"|410 
|}

|-
  
|Conservative
|Robert Charles   MATTHEWS
|align="right"| 6,603 
 
|Independent Conservative
| Cecil William  ARMSTRONG
|align="right"|4,509 
  
|Liberal
|Alexander Smirle LAWSON
|align="right"|4,429 
|}

|-
  
|Conservative
|Robert Charles   MATTHEWS
|align="right"| 10,949
  
|Liberal
|Patrick   DONNELLY
|align="right"|5,461    
|}

See also 

 List of Canadian federal electoral districts
 Past Canadian electoral districts

External links 

 Website of the Parliament of Canada

Former federal electoral districts of Ontario
Federal electoral districts of Toronto